Ground-Based Midcourse Defense (GMD) is the United States' anti-ballistic missile system for intercepting incoming warheads in space, during the midcourse phase of ballistic trajectory flight. It is a major component of the American missile defense strategy to counter ballistic missiles, including intercontinental ballistic missiles (ICBMs) carrying nuclear, chemical, biological or conventional warheads. The system is deployed in military bases in the states of Alaska and California; in 2018 comprising 44 interceptors and spanning 15 time zones with sensors on land, at sea, and in orbit. In 2019, a missile defense review requested that 20 additional ground-based interceptors be based in Alaska.

GMD is administered by the U.S. Missile Defense Agency (MDA), while the operational control and execution is provided by the U.S. Army, and support functions are provided by the U.S. Air Force. Previously known as National Missile Defense (NMD), the name was changed in 2002 to differentiate it from other U.S. missile defense programs, such as space-based and sea-based intercept programs, or defense targeting the boost phase and reentry flight phases. The program was projected to have cost $40 billion by 2017. That year, the MDA scheduled its first intercept test in three years in the wake of North Korea's accelerated long-range missile testing program.

Description

The system consists of radar and ground-based interceptor missiles for intercepting incoming warheads in space. Boeing Defense, Space & Security is the prime contractor of the program, tasked to oversee and integrate systems from other major defense sub-contractors, such as Computer Sciences Corporation and Raytheon.

The key sub-systems of the GMD system are:
 Exoatmospheric Kill Vehicle (EKV) – Raytheon
 Ground-Based Interceptor (GBI) – boost vehicle built by Orbital Sciences; for every interceptor missile there are a missile silo and a silo interface vault (SIV), which is an underground electronics room adjacent to the silo.
 Battle management command, control and communications (BMC3) – Northrop Grumman
 Ground-based radars (GBR) – Raytheon
 AN/FPS-132 Upgraded Early Warning Radar (UEWR)  – Raytheon
 Forward-based X band radars (FBXB), such as the sea-based X-band platform and the AN/TPY-2 — Raytheon

Interceptor sites are at Fort Greely, Alaska and Vandenberg Space Force Base, California. A third site was planned for a proposed US missile defense complex in Poland, but was canceled in September 2009.

In December 2008, the U.S. Missile Defense Agency awarded Boeing a $397.9 million contract to continue development of the program.

In March 2013, the Obama administration announced plans to add 14 interceptors to the current 26 at Fort Greely in response to North Korean threats. The deployment of a second TPY-2 radar to Japan was announced at the same time. While President Obama said that the additional deployment was a hedge against unexpected capabilities, Chinese Ministry of Foreign Affairs spokesman Hong Lei complained that the additional defenses would affect the global strategic balance and strategic trust. In late 2013, there were plans for a proposed Eastern United States missile defense site to house a battery of these missiles.

On 30 April 2014, the Government Accountability Office issued a report stating that the system may not be operational any time soon because "its development was flawed". It said the GBI missile was at that point "capable of intercepting a simple threat in a limited way". On 12 August 2015, Lt. General David L. Mann (commanding general USASMDC/ARSTRAT) characterized GMD as the nation's only ground-based defense against limited ICBM attacks.

Issues with the EKV prompted the MDA to work with Raytheon, Boeing, and Lockheed Martin on a new Redesigned Kill Vehicle (RKV), scheduled to debut in 2025. In 2019, the government issued a stop work order for the RKV after recent test results indicated that the current RKV plan is not viable.  The government "initiated an analysis of alternative courses of action"; on 21 August the MDA cancelled the $5.8 billion contract for the RKV. This initiates new work on bids for the successor to the Exo-Atmospheric Kill Vehicle (EKV) to 2025. The current GMD programs continue per plan, with up to 64 GBIs (meaning an additional 20) in the missile fields for 2019.

Program costs

Expenditures on the Ground-Based Midcourse Defense program were estimated to be US$30.7 billion by 2007. In 2013, it was estimated that the program would cost $40.926 billion from inception through fiscal year 2017; in 2013–17 spending was to total $4,457.8M, an average of $892M per year.

Flight tests
BV: Booster Verification Test
CMCM: Critical Measurements and Countermeasures
CTV: Control Test Vehicle
FTG: Flight Test Ground-Based Interceptor
FTX: Flight Test Other
IFT: Integrated Flight Test

Intercept tests
After the FTG-11 test on 25 March 2019, 11 of the 20 (55%) hit-to-kill intercept tests have succeeded. No flight intercept tests from 2010 to 2013 were successful. In response the Pentagon asked for a budget increase and another test for the fielded program. The successful intercept FTG-15 was accomplished by an operational team of the 100th Missile Defense Brigade using their standard operating procedures (round-the-clock 24/7). Although they knew in advance that there would be a test launch, they did not know exactly when it would occur or its exact nature.

Non-intercept tests

Canceled tests
Throughout the program's history, multiple test flights have been canceled, including BV-4, IFT-11, -12, -13, -13A, -15, FTC-03, and, most recently, FTG-04.

Estimated effectiveness 
The system has a "single shot probability of kill" of its interceptors calculated at 56%, with the total probability of intercepting a single target, if four interceptors are launched, at 97%. Each interceptor costs approximately $75 million.

See also
 Terminal High Altitude Area Defense (THAAD), mobile land-based missile defense system
 Medium Extended Air Defense System, mobile land-based air and missile defense system
 Aegis Ballistic Missile Defense System, sea-based missile defense system
 A-135 anti-ballistic missile system
 A-235 anti-ballistic missile system
 S-300VM missile system
 S-400 missile system
 S-500 missile system
SC-19
 Arrow (Israeli missile)
 Arrow 3
 Proposed Eastern United States missile defense site

References

External links

 Ground-based Midcourse Defense (GMD) System page on Boeing site
 GMD page on Missile Defense Agency site
 Missile Threat - GMD on CSIS.org
 Boeing Ground-Based Interceptor on Designation Systems site
 Ballistic Missile Defense System page on Global Security site

Missile Defense Agency
Anti-ballistic missiles of the United States
Boeing
Raytheon Company products
Lockheed Martin